Psyclone is the eighth studio album for Australian rock singer Jimmy Barnes. It was released in Australia by Mushroom Records in June 1995 and peaked at number 2 on the ARIA chart.

Barnes said in 2010: "When I made Psyclone, I was at the height of my alcoholism and addiction. I was literally staring into the abyss".

Track listing
All tracks written by Barnes, except track 3 written by Jimmy Barnes, Guy Davies, Michael Hegerty and Jeff Neill
 "Used to the Truth" – 4:24
 "Spend the Night" – 3:52
 "Change of Heart" – 5:08
 "Every Beat" – 4:35
 "Come Undone" – 4:55
 "Stumbling" – 4:03
 "Love and Devotion" – 4:39
 "Mirror of Your Soul" – 5:39
 "Just a Man" – 3:56
 "Fooling Yourself" – 4:26
 "Tears" – 4:50
 "Going Down Alone" – 5:08
 "Because You Wanted It" – 3:53

Credits
 Jimmy Barnes – vocals and producer
 Joe Hardy – producer and engineer

Charts

Certifications

References

1995 albums
Jimmy Barnes albums
Mushroom Records albums